Dr. Hubert Benbury Haywood House is a historic home located at Raleigh, Wake County, North Carolina.  It was built in 1916, and is a two-story, Prairie School-style brick dwelling with a green tile hipped roof and two-bay wide, one-bay deep, one-story brick sun porch.  A two-story rear ell was added in 1928.  The interior has Colonial Revival style design elements.

It was listed on the National Register of Historic Places in 1995.

References

Houses on the National Register of Historic Places in North Carolina
Colonial Revival architecture in North Carolina
Prairie School architecture in North Carolina
Houses completed in 1916
Houses in Raleigh, North Carolina
National Register of Historic Places in Raleigh, North Carolina